Eucoelium is a genus of tunicates belonging to the family Polycitoridae.

The species of this genus are found in Australia and Southern Africa.

Species:

Eucoelium coronarium 
Eucoelium hospitiolum 
Eucoelium mariae 
Eucoelium orientalis 
Eucoelium pallidus 
Eucoelium peresi 
Eucoelium setoensis 
Eucoelium stelliferum

References

Tunicates